Jan van der Vaart may refer to one of the following persons:

 Jan van der Vaart (ceramist) (1931 – 2000), a Dutch ceramist 
 Jan van der Vaart (painter) (c.1650 –1727), a Dutch painter